Diego José Martins (born June 19, 1983 in Porangatu) is a Brazilian footballer. His previous team was Charlotte Eagles in the USL Professional Division and Rochester Lancers.

Career

Early career
Martins grew up playing in the youth system for Gama, where he played as an amateur for the Gama Júniors. Martins led his club to three amateur Brasília state championships, scoring 18 goals, before being called up to the senior Gama team in 2003, at age 17.

Professional
Martins won two professional Brasília state championships and a Brazilian Serie C National Championship with Gama, and was the team MVP in 2004; his performances with the team led to him signing with Capital FC in 2005. While playing for Capital, Martins scored a famous goal known as the "goal Pelé couldn't score", looping a shot over the opposition goalkeeper from 50 yards out.

Martins transferred to Anapolina of the Campeonato Brasileiro Série B in 2006, where he was nominated Player of the Week three times, and was the team's end-of-season MVP. His play with Anápolis caught the eye of Portuguese scouts, leading to him moving to Aves in the Portuguese Liga in 2007. After spending two years rubbing shoulders with teams such as Benfica, Sporting CP and FC Porto, Martins took an opportunity to move to the United States, and signed with the Charlotte Eagles of the USL Second Division in early 2009.

References

External links
 Charlotte Eagles bio 

1983 births
Living people
Brazilian footballers
Sociedade Esportiva do Gama players
C.D. Aves players
Associação Atlética Anapolina players
Ceilândia Esporte Clube players
Charlotte Eagles players
USL Second Division players
USL Championship players
Brazilian expatriates in Portugal
Expatriate footballers in Portugal
Brazilian expatriates in the United States
Association football midfielders